Sudha Menon is an author, actor, motivational speaker and founder of writing workshop series, Get Writing and Writing With Women. She is the author of six non-fiction books: 'Recipes For Life', Feisty at Fifty, Legacy: Letters to their daughters from eminent Indian men and women, Gifted: inspirational stories of people with disabilities, and Devi, Diva or She-Devil: The Smart Career woman's survival guide and Leading Ladies: Women Who Inspire India.
Her books have been translated into several Indian languages including Marathi, Hindi, Malayalam, Kannada, Bengali and Tamil.

Early life and career
Sudha was born in suburban Mumbai where she completed her studies before pursuing her childhood dream of becoming a journalist. After putting in over 20 years as a journalist at The Independent (Bennet Coleman), The Hindu Business Line (Kasturi & Sons Lt) and Mint ( HT Media), she decided to follow her other dream, of authoring a book. Her first book, Leading Ladies: Women Who Inspire India, (42Bookz Galaxy) on the inspiring journeys of some of the country’s most admired and accomplished women, was launched in end 2010.

In early 2012, she launched her next book, Legacy, (Random House India) a collection of letters to their daughters from eminent Indian men and women. The book provided a rare insight into the minds of these leaders who set aside their public images to reveal to their daughters the lessons that they learnt along their own journeys and the values that they adopted to lead a responsible and fulfilled life.

Sudha's next book, Gifted: Inspiring stories of people with disabilities (Random House), was co-written with V.R.Ferose and launched in mid-2014. "Listening to their stories of struggle and their eventual triumph over the most insurmountable challenges was a transformative experience. I will never again presume that people with disabilities are incapable of doing the things that "normally-abled" people can do. There is much we can learn from the lives of those with disabilities,"
Having found her true calling as an author, Menon says she felt compelled to tell the world about the liberating and therapeutic value of writing down one’s thoughts.

Her book Devi, Diva or She-Devil: The Smart Career Woman’s Survival Guide is a treasure trove of survival tips for career women, straight from the mouths of some of India's smartest women. With insights from successful women in various fields, this book could well be every woman's best friend, the little black book of secret mantras to take on every challenge and lead a fulfilled, happy life.

Feisty at Fifty is a part-funny, part thought provoking look at her adventures as a woman of fifty plus years and could be a precious guide to women of that age who want to make their fifties the best decade of their life.

Sudha is founder of 'Get Writing! , a writing workshop that helps people kick start their writing journey and 'Writing in the Park', an initiative that she started to get people to spend time in the outdoors, writing in public parks and gardens. Her Writing With Women (WWW) gets women from different backgrounds together to share their experiences and write about them.

She also runs "Telling Our Stories", a voluntary initiative where she works with senior citizens in Pune to help them write their stories and thus capture the legacy that they will leave for posterity. Sudha draws inspiration from the most ordinary people and their extraordinary courage in the face of life's knocks.

Sudha is a motivational speaker who has conducted numerous inspirational workshops and women's leadership sessions for various corporate houses, educational institutions and NGO's across the country. She was a speaker at TEDxPune 2013 edition.
She has also spoken on other platforms including CII, IiECON and at BITS, Pilani
Sudha lives in Pune with her husband, an IT professional and daughter, a pastry chef.

Books
Legacy: Letters from Eminent Parents to Their Daughters
Gifted : Inspiring Stories of People with Disabilities
Leading Ladies: Women Who Inspire India
Devi, Diva or She-Devil: The smart career woman's survival guide
Feisty at Fifty
Recipes for Life

Media reviews of Recipes For Life:

https://www.mid-day.com/sunday-mid-day/article/the-kitchens-that-made-us-23191964

The Indian Express   https://indianexpress.com/article/books-and-literature/biryani-for-sachin-by-irfan-pathans-mother-and-the-favourite-foods-of-mary-kom-tisca-chopra-uday-kotak-7496571/

The Hindu       https://www.thehindu.com/life-and-style/food/sudha-menon-book-recipes-for-life-comfort-food-indians/article36136965.ece

The Week   https://www.theweek.in/theweek/leisure/2021/10/07/from-vidya-balan-to-Irfan-pathan-celebrities-on-their-moms-cooking.html

Outlook Traveller  https://www.outlookindia.com/outlooktraveller/explore/story/71504/recipes-for-life-cherishing-the-food-that-we-grew-up-with

Feisty At Fifty is a part-funny, part thought provoking look at her adventures as a woman of fifty plus years and could be a precious guide to women of that age who want to make their fifties the best decade of their life.

https://www.theweek.in/review/books/2019/01/04/embracing-the-big-five-oh.html

https://www.thehindu.com/authors/i-have-never-felt-so-empowered/article25597594.ece

https://indianexpress.com/article/lifestyle/books/sudha-menon-author-fiesty-at-fifty-book-5387119/

http://www.newindianexpress.com/cities/bengaluru/2018/oct/30/goodbye-societal-norms-goodbye-judgements-1892096.html

http://www.asianage.com/books/221118/when-age-is-just-a-number.html

https://www.shethepeople.tv/news/sudha-menon-feisty-fifty-shows-that-life-indeed-begins-at-fifty

https://www.womensweb.in/2018/11/sudha-menon-memoir-feisty-at-fifty-book-review-nov18wk4sr/

See also
 List of Indian writers

References

Writers from Mumbai
Living people
Articles created or expanded during Women's History Month (India) - 2015
Women writers from Maharashtra
Indian women columnists
Indian columnists
Journalists from Maharashtra
Indian women journalists
20th-century Indian journalists
Year of birth missing (living people)
20th-century Indian women